Fencing competitions at the 2010 Summer Youth Olympics in Singapore consisted of three Cadet Male individual events, three Cadet Female individual events and one team event including both genders and all 3 weapons: épée, foil and saber. 78 fencers from 36 nations were competing. The venue was located at the International Convention Centre (ICC).

Fencing was one of the five sports that was continually featured at the Olympics since Athens in 1896; the others being athletics, swimming, cycling and gymnastics.

Schedule

Qualifications

FIE Qualifications After 2010 Baku Cadet World Championships

Initially FIE qualified 54 fencers based on the results of 2010 Cadet World Championships in Baku with 1 more entry in each weapon reserved for a host country

A table below illustrates these selections, where number in brackets near fencers' names shows their placement  in 2010 Cadet World Championships:

2010 WC medalists prevented from entering YOG through qualifying procedure

By minimum age limit (born in 1995)
 , silver medal in men's épée
 , bronze medal in men's épée
 , bronze medal in women Sabre

By exceeding NOC quota of one fencer per NOC
  , Silver Medal in Women Saber
  , Silver Medal in Men's Saber
  , Bronze Medal in Men's Foil

By teammate substitution
 , Gold Medal in Women's foil

Final selections
Finalized selection table included 20 additional fencers added by FIE and IOC  based on the final revision of "Criteria for qualification to the 2010 YOG" published here. The following table illustrates final selections where numbers in brackets near fencers' names indicates their placement in 2010 Cadet WC (zero indicates that fencer did not participate).

Mixed teams composition
In total there will be 9 continental teams formed.
The composition of the teams will be determined by the results achieved during the individual events. The best fencers ranked in each weapon will form the top team of each continent as follows: Europe 1, Europe 2, Europe 3, Europe 4, Asia 1, Asia 2, Americas 1, Americas 2, Africa.

Medal summary

Medal table
This table presents only individual results. Mixed team medals are not included.

Events

Participating nations

Fencer's distribution by continent

See also
 Fédération Internationale d'Escrime (FIE)

References

 
2010 Summer Youth Olympics events
Youth Summer Olympics
2010
Fencing competitions in Singapore